TMG Racing, previously called AMG Motorsport and currently competing as Lubrax | Podium Stock Car Team due to sponsorship reasons, is a Brazilian auto racing team based in Americana, São Paulo that currently competes in Stock Car Brasil.

Created in the 2003 final, AMG Motorsport originated from the G5 Racing team, directed by Mr. Affonso Giaffone and with the participation of partners Maurício Matos, Edvaldo Zaghetti and Alex Gesell.

In 2011, the departure of one of the three partners is announced, Mr. Mauricio Matos - team leader - and the entry of Thiago Meneghel to occupy the same position in 2012. With that, the team is renamed TMG Racing, the name used until the present day and commanded exclusively by this one.

In 2017, the team will have the support of Shell V-Power. This partnership ended at the end of the 2019 season.

From 2020, the team changes its Stock Car colors and starts to have a partnership with Blau Motorsport.

References

External links
  

Stock Car Brasil teams
Auto racing teams established in 2003
Brazilian auto racing teams